Shawnee Council may be:

 Shawnee Council (Ohio)
 Shawnee Council (Oklahoma)